Groupe Scolaire Le Détroit is a French international school in Tangier, Morocco. A part of the Mission laïque française (MLF), it serves petite section through terminale (final year of lycée or senior high school/sixth form college).

References

External links
 Groupe Scolaire Le Détroit 

Schools in Tangier
French international schools in Morocco